Fables of the Reconstruction, also known as Reconstruction of the Fables, is the third studio album by American alternative rock band R.E.M., released on I.R.S. Records on June 10, 1985. The Joe Boyd-produced album was the first recorded by the group outside the United States. Many of the album's lyrics take inspiration from Southern Gothic themes and characters.

History
Despite the growing audience and critical acclaim experienced by the band after its first two albums, Murmur and Reckoning, R.E.M. decided to make noticeable changes to its style of music and recording habits, including a change in producer to Joe Boyd and in recording location to London, England. Boyd was best known for his work with modern English folk musicians, including such acts as Fairport Convention and Nick Drake.

Lyrically, the album explores the mythology and landscape of the South, and the title and chorus of "Cant Get There from Here", the album's first single (intentionally misspelled, like most contractions and possessives in R.E.M. titles), is a rural American colloquialism sometimes used in response to a request by travelers for difficult directions (the video for the song received airplay on MTV).

Music and lyrical themes

The opening song, "Feeling Gravitys Pull" (sic), describes falling asleep while reading; Michael Stipe's lyrics also reference surrealist photographer Man Ray, setting the tone for the album. The song was a musical departure for the band, making use of a dark, chromatic guitar figure by Peter Buck, and a string quartet, while R.E.M.'s previous albums had opened with rhythmic, "jangly" rock songs.

"Maps and Legends" fits the earlier sound and features distinct harmony vocals by bassist Mike Mills, singing different lyrics from Stipe. The song is dedicated to the Reverend Howard Finster, a noted outsider artist whom the band considered to be "a man of vision and feeling—a fine example to all" (Finster created the album sleeve for R.E.M.'s Reckoning the previous year).

"Driver 8" describes the scenery surrounding railroad tracks in somewhat abstract terms. Trains are a frequent motif in rural American music, suggesting the freedom and promise of an escape from one's home environment. Driven by a distinctive guitar riff, "Driver 8" was one of the songs on the album to receive college radio play, and the record company also authorized a music video.

Beginning with a soft introduction, "Life and How to Live It" charged through another atmospheric, folk rock arrangement and referenced storytelling. Without mentioning him by name, the song was about Athens, Georgia, author Brivs Mekis, as alluded to in the live performance on the And I Feel Fine... bonus disc. (Mekis wrote a book titled Life: How to Live, and had it printed, only to have all existing copies of it stacked in his closet.)

Much of the band's songwriting material in this era also came from the members' own experiences traveling through the country in near-constant tours over the previous several years, as well as an increasing sense of political activism which would find expression on subsequent albums Lifes Rich Pageant and Document. Stipe later said that his previous lyrics never really had any literal meanings, and that by this time he had begun to write lyrics that told stories.

The song "Green Grow the Rushes" is a prime example, which contains the line "the amber waves of gain", is thought (by biographer Marcus Gray) to be about migrant farm laborers and also alludes to the folk song "Green Grow the Rushes, O". Natalie Merchant is quoted as saying: "I was doing a lot of research about the genocide against the native American Indians, and we made a pact that we'd both write songs about their plight." Her song, "Among the Americans", appeared on the 1985 10,000 Maniacs album The Wishing Chair.

"Kohoutek" (misspelled as "Kahoetek" in the album's liner notes) referenced the comet Kohoutek, and is perhaps one of the earliest R.E.M. songs about a romantic relationship, using the comet as a simile for a lover: "like Kohoutek, you were gone."

The song "Auctioneer (Another Engine)" deviated from the typical R.E.M. sound of the time, with jagged guitar riffs and more references to old rural ways of life.

The plaintive "Good Advices" contains the following Stipe lyric that has been quoted in musical and literary contexts: "When you meet a stranger, look at his shoes / keep your money in your shoes."

A celebration of an eccentric individual is the subject of "Old Man Kensey" (which has lyrics by Stipe's friend Jeremy Ayers) and closing track "Wendell Gee". The latter, a ballad with piano and more harmonies from Berry and Mills, was the album's third and final single in the UK only, although it made no commercial impression there.

Reviewer Matthew Perpetua describes the album's lyrics as particularly "preoccupied with the behavior of mysterious older men" and "imagining the inner lives of outsiders and recluses" with "a sound that evokes images of railroads, small towns, eccentric locals, oppressive humidity, and a vague sense of time slowing to a crawl".

The following additional songs were recorded during the Fables of the Reconstruction sessions:

Release
Upon release, Fables of the Reconstruction reached #28 in the United States (going gold in 1991) and was the band's best showing yet in the UK, peaking at  35. Recorded during a period of internal strife—largely due to the R.E.M. members' homesickness and an unpleasant London winter—the band's unenthusiastic view of the album has been public for years, and is often reflected among fans and the press. Drummer Bill Berry was quoted in the early 1990s as saying that Fables of the Reconstruction "sucked". Guitarist Peter Buck dismissed single "Driver 8" saying, "I can write that kind of stuff in my sleep." Frontman Michael Stipe once shared the opinion, but later said that he considers it to be the strongest collection of songs among their 1980s albums, telling producer Joe Boyd that he had grown to love the album.

Peter Buck, in the liner notes of the 25th Anniversary Deluxe edition, said, "Over the years, a certain misapprehension about Fables of the Reconstruction has built up. For some reason, people have the impression that the members of R.E.M. don't like the record. Nothing could be further from the truth. [...] It's a personal favorite, and I'm really proud of how strange it is. Nobody but R.E.M. could have made that record."

Fables was often characterized by a slow tempo and an intentionally murky sound, in contrast with the more upbeat and jangly (if equally abstract) sound of earlier R.E.M. material. Nevertheless, the focus on American folk instruments such as the banjo in "Wendell Gee" and a few additional orchestrations (string instruments in "Feeling Gravitys Pull" and honking brass in " Get There from Here") began the band's route toward the layered, acoustic-based sound they adopted for their popular breakthrough in the late 1980s and early 1990s with albums such as Document, Green, Out of Time and Automatic for the People.

Track listing
All songs written by Bill Berry, Peter Buck, Mike Mills and Michael Stipe except where noted.

Side one – "Fables of the Reconstruction"
"Feeling  Pull" – 4:48
"Maps and Legends" – 3:10
"Driver 8" – 3:23
"Life and How to Live It" – 4:06
"Old Man Kensey" (Jeremy Ayers, Berry, Buck, Mills, Stipe) – 4:08

Side two – "Reconstruction of the Fables"
"Cant Get There from Here" – 3:39
"Green Grow the Rushes" – 3:46
"Kohoutek" – 3:18
"Auctioneer (Another Engine)" – 2:44
"Good Advices" – 3:30
"Wendell Gee" – 3:01

Personnel
R.E.M.
 Bill Berry – drums, backing vocals (credited as "WT Berry – Best Boy")
 Peter Buck – guitar, banjo, harmonica (credited as "PL Buck – Ministry of Music")
 Mike Mills – bass guitar, backing vocals, piano (credited as "ME Mills – Consolate Mediator")
 Michael Stipe – lead vocals (credited as "JM Stipe – Gaffer Interpreter")

Additional musicians
 David Bitelli – tenor saxophone and baritone saxophone on "Cant Get There from Here"
 Camilla Brunt – violin on "Feeling Gravitys Pull"
 Jim Dvorak – trumpet on "Cant Get There from Here"
 Philippa Ibbotson – violin on "Feeling Gravitys Pull"
 David Newby – cello on "Feeling Gravitys Pull"
 Pete Thomas – tenor saxophone on "Cant Get There from Here"

Production
 Joe Boyd – production
 Berry Clempson – audio engineering
 Tony Harris – engineering
 M. K. Johnston – photography and art

Chart performance
Album

Singles

Certifications

Release history

Notes
† I.R.S. Vintage Years edition, with bonus tracks
†† 25th Anniversary edition, with bonus disc

References

External links
R.E.M.HQ on Fables of the Reconstruction

 (I.R.S. Vintage Years edition)
 (LP reissue)

1985 albums
Albums produced by Joe Boyd
I.R.S. Records albums
R.E.M. albums
Concept albums
Capitol Records albums
Southern Gothic media
Folk rock albums by American artists
Psychedelic folk albums
Psychedelic rock albums by American artists